Tagiades, commonly known as snow flats, is a genus of spread-winged skipper butterflies. It is the type genus of the tribe Tagiadini of the subfamily Pyrginae in the family Hesperiidae. It contains seventeen species; three of which are found in tropical Africa, while fourteen are found from India, Sri Lanka, Southeast Asia, northeast Australia, to the Pacific Islands. They can sometimes be encountered in partially cleared or cultivated areas. They usually rest on the undersides of leaves. When disturbed they will fly away but will usually return to the preferred area, often to the same leaf.

Species
 Tagiades atticus (Fabricius, 1793)
 Tagiades calligana Butler, [1879] - Thailand, Malaysia, Sumatra, Singapore, Borneo, Java, Nias, Belitung, and Bangka Island
 Tagiades ceylonica Evans, 1932
 Tagiades cohaerens Mabille, 1914 - Malaysia, Burma, Thailand, the northwestern Himalayas, and possibly China
 Tagiades elegans Mabille, 1877
 Tagiades flesus (Fabricius, 1781) (clouded forester) - Transkei to Zimbabwe and Botswana in Africa
 Tagiades gana (Moore, [1866]) (large snow flat) - widespread in India, Indochina, and maritime Southeast Asia
 Tagiades hovia Swinhoe, 1904
 Tagiades hybridus Devyatkin, 2001 - central Vietnam
 Tagiades inconspicua Rothschild, 1915
 Tagiades insularis Mabille, 1876 - Madagascar
 Tagiades janetta Butler, 1870
 Tagiades japetus (Stoll, [1781]) (pied flat or common snow flat) - widespread in India, Indochina, maritime Southeast Asia, and north-eastern Australia
 Tagiades kina Evans, 1934
 Tagiades korela Mabille, 1891
 Tagiades lavata Butler, [1879] - southern Burma, Thailand, Malaysia, Borneo, Sumatra, Java, and the Natuna Islands
 Tagiades litigiosa Möschler, 1878 (water snow flat) - Sri Lanka, southern India, Assam, the Himalayas, and Indochina
 Tagiades martinus Plötz, 1884
 Tagiades menaka (Moore, [1866]) (dark edged snow flat or spotted snow flat) - Himalayas (from Kashmir to Assam), Indochina, and Hainan
 Tagiades neira Plötz, 1885
 Tagiades nestus (C. Felder, 1860) (Papuan snow flat) - Papua New Guinea, the Duke of York Island, and northern Australia
 Tagiades obscurus Mabille, 1876
 Tagiades parra Fruhstorfer, 1910 - Indochina and maritime Southeast Asia
 Tagiades presbyter Butler, 1882
 Tagiades ravi (Moore, [1866])
 Tagiades sambavana Elwes and Edwards, 1897
 Tagiades samborana Grose-Smith, 1891 - Madagascar
 Tagiades sem Mabille, 1883
 Tagiades sheba Evans, 1934
 Tagiades silvia Evans, 1934
 Tagiades titus Plötz, 1884
 Tagiades tethys (Ménétries, 1857) - eastern Asia including Japan, Taiwan and Korea
 Tagiades toba de Nicéville, [1896] - Assam to maritime Southeast Asia
 Tagiades trebellius (Hopffer, 1874) - Japan, the Philippines, and Sulawesi and the surrounding islands
 Tagiades tubulus Fruhstorfer, 1910
 Tagiades ultra Evans, 1932 - Indochina, maritime Southeast Asia, to Palawan in the Philippines
 Tagiades waterstradti Elwes & Edwards, 1897 - maritime Southeast Asia

Gallery

References

External links
Tagiades at funet

 
Tagiadini
Hesperiidae genera
Taxa named by Jacob Hübner